Domestic Goddess may refer to:
A female household deity
Domestic Goddess (television), a planned cooking show hosted by Roseanne Barr that was canceled before airing 
Nickname of Nigella Lawson, author of a cookbook entitled How to Be a Domestic Goddess